Emanuel Zisman (11 February 1935 – 11 November 2009) was an Israeli politician and ambassador. He served as a member of the Knesset between 1988 and 1999.

Biography
Zisman was born in Plovdiv in Bulgaria. On 10 March 1943, the Jewish community of Plovdiv, including Zisman and his mother and sister, were rounded up for deportation in the Jewish quarter of the city, near the school. In the wake of public pressure Tsar Boris III cancelled the order. Zisman later made aliyah to newly independent Israel in 1949. Married to Sara with three children, he lived in the Nayot neighborhood of Jerusalem.

Political career
Zisman was a member of Jerusalem city council and served as the Labor Party's chairman in the Jerusalem region. He was first elected to the Knesset on the Alignment list in 1988, and was re-elected in 1992, by which time the Alignment had merged into the Labor Party.

On 7 March 1996 Zisman and Avigdor Kahlani left the Labor Party to form the Third Way. The new party won four seats in the elections that year, and joined Benjamin Netanyahu's government. On 29 March 1999 Zisman left the party to serve the rest of the term as an independent MK. He lost his seat in the May 1999 elections.

In October 2000 he was appointed Ambassador to Bulgaria, a post he held until 2002.

Awards
 In 2006, Zisman received the Yakir Yerushalayim (Worthy Citizen of Jerusalem) award from the city of Jerusalem.

References

External links

1935 births
2009 deaths
Bulgarian Jews in Israel
Israeli Jews
Bulgarian emigrants to Israel
Israeli people of Bulgarian-Jewish descent
Ambassadors of Israel to Bulgaria
Third Way (Israel) politicians
Israeli Labor Party politicians
Alignment (Israel) politicians
Members of the 12th Knesset (1988–1992)
Members of the 13th Knesset (1992–1996)
Members of the 14th Knesset (1996–1999)